Noro may refer to:

 Noro, Solomon Islands
 , in the Cíes Islands, Spain
 Noro (priestess), within the Magiri system of the Ryukyu Kingdom in the Ryukyu Islands
 "Noro", a song on the 2009 album Daisy by Brand New

People with the surname
, Japanese economic historian
 Masamichi Noro, aikido master and founder of kinomichi
 , Japanese metallurgist

See also
 Eisaku Noro Company, a Japanese manufacturer of color-transitioning yarn
 Norovirus
 Norro (disambiguation)

Japanese-language surnames